National Expert Group on Vaccine Administration for COVID-19 (NEGVAC) is an expert committee constituted by the Ministry of Health and Family Welfare (MoHFW), India to provide advice and guidance on all aspects of COVID-19 vaccination. The committee is also responsible for prioritisation of population groups in the country, deciding procurement and inventory management procedure, selection and delivery of vaccines etc.

Committee 
NEGVAC was constituted in mid-2020 and first met on 12 August 2020. is chaired by member (Health), NITI Aayog, and co-chaired by the secretary of MoHFW. The committee has representative secretaries from:
 Vinod Kumar Paul
 Department of Expenditure
 Department of Biotechnology
 Department of Health Research
 Department of Pharmaceuticals
 Ministry of Electronics and Information Technology
 Members representing five state governments
 Technical experts
Members include Samiran Panda, head of the Epidemiology and Communicable Diseases division in ICMR.

References 

Scientific funding advisory bodies
COVID-19 pandemic in India